Mostly Ghostly (also known as Mostly Ghostly: Who Let the Ghosts Out?) is a 2008 American horror comedy fantasy film directed by Rich Correll. The film is based on the first book, Who Let the Ghosts Out? by R. L. Stine and the first installment of the Mostly Ghostly film series. It was released on September 30, 2008 on DVD, and was broadcast on Disney Channel on October 31, 2008.

Plot 
Max Doyle (Sterling Beaumon) is an 11-year-old whose love of performing magic disappoints his father (David DeLuise) and draws ridicule from his older brother, Colin (Adam Hicks). While doing laundry in the basement, Max hears voices. While investigating the source of the sound, he sees a hand come out of the wall. A hidden tunnel behind the wall happens to harbor the evil Phears (Brian Stepanek) and his cadre of ghosts. Phears is intent on freeing himself and his minions from the world of ghosts to inhabit the physical world but will be able to do so only on Halloween.

Later, Max finds the ghosts of two children, Nicky (Luke Benward) and Tara Roland (Madison Pettis), have suddenly come to occupy his room. They explain that they need his help in learning who they are, how they came to be ghosts, and what has happened to their parents. Although they cannot be seen by anyone but Max, they are able to interact with objects in the physical world. This allows them to frighten a boy who has been bullying Max at school. Shortly thereafter, Tara and Nicky learn it was Phears who killed their parents and now holds the ghosts of their parents captive. During rehearsal of Max's magic show, Tara is captured by Phears.

Max tells Nicky about it and suggests Nicky throw him into the basement tunnel to find her. The same way (most) people don't see ghosts, ghosts cannot see Max. He retrieves a box from Tara that contains a ring to defeat the evil ghosts, but Phears prevents her from escaping with him. Traci (Ali Lohan), a girl Max has been crushing on, becomes his assistant for his magic show. They perform with the help of Nicky moving objects around, making it appear as if it was Max moving them with his magic. On Halloween, Phears finally breaks the tunnel wall and crashes the show.

There, Max chants the spell (From the light of earth the dark descends, should they return that all depends, when hands point up to moonlit skies, on 10–31 the darkness dies) and Phears' minions are sent back to the depths of the earth. Max receives applause from the audience who believed that everything was part of the show, while Phears himself escapes in the form of a roach without anyone seeing him.

Cast 
 Sterling Beaumon as Max Doyle – An eleven-year-old boy who is forced to keep Nicky and Tara away from their enemy, Phears, because only he can see them. 
 Madison Pettis as Tara Roland – A nine-year-old ghost of a young girl who likes Max more than her brother, Nicky. She is the youngest. She lived in the house Max lives before the Doyles moved in. 
 Luke Benward as Nicholas "Nicky" Roland – Tara's older brother who sometimes takes a dislike to Max. 
 Brian Stepanek as Phears –  An evil ghost who is after Nicky and Tara after taking their parents. 
 Ali Lohan as Traci Walker – A popular girl
 Adam Hicks as Colin Doyle – Max's older brother
 David DeLuise as John Doyle – Max and Colin's father
 Kim Rhodes as Harriet Doyle – Max and Colin's mother

Sequel 
A sequel, Mostly Ghostly: Have You Met My Ghoulfriend?, was released on DVD on September 2, 2014. Madison Pettis reprised her role as Tara, with new additions Bella Thorne, Calum Worthy, Ryan Ochoa, Eric Allan Kramer and Roshon Fegan signed onto the film. Charlie Hewson replaced Brian Stepanek as the character of Phears. Filming for the sequel was completed on April 17, 2014.

See also
List of ghost films

References

External links 
 Official movie site
 
 
 
 

2008 fantasy films
2000s comedy horror films
2008 films
American comedy horror films
American children's films
2000s English-language films
American films about Halloween
Films shot in Scotland
Films about orphans
Films based on children's books
Films about children
American ghost films
Films based on works by R. L. Stine
Universal Pictures direct-to-video films
Films with screenplays by Pat Proft
2008 comedy films
2000s American films